The 715th Infantry Division was a German infantry division which fought during World War II.

Composition
As of 1942, the composition of the 715th Infantry Division was as follows:
715th Infantry Regiment
735th Infantry Regiment
671st Artillery Battalion
715th Reconnaissance Company
715th Engineer Battalion
715th Signal Company
715th Divisional Supply Troops

Unit History

The 715th (Static) Infantry Division was activated on 8 May 1941, and sent to southwestern France that fall. In late summer 1943, it took over the Cannes-Nice sector on the Mediterranean coast when elements of the Italian 4th Army returned home. In January 1944, the 715th was sent to Italy following the allied landings at Anzio and fought there until June, suffering heavy losses when the Allies broke out of the beachhead and took Rome. Sent to the rear, the 715th was rebuilt, largely from troops of the reinforced 1028th Grenadier Regiment and Shadow Division Wildflecken, which it absorbed. The division fought in the Gothic Line battles in September and was transferred to the Adriatic sector soon after. During this time the Italian Bersaglieri battalion "Mameli" fought under the command of the 715th Infantry Division. Rebuilt again in February 1945, it now included the 725th, 735th, and 774th Grenadier Regiments (two battalions each), the 671st Artillery Regiment (three battalions), the 715th Fusilier Battalion, the 715th Engineer Battalion, the 715th Tank Destroyer Battalion, the 715th Signal Company and the 715th Field Replacement Battalion. In early 1945, it was sent to the 1st Panzer Army on the Eastern Front, fought in Upper Silesia and surrendered to the Soviets in the Tábor-Pisek area of Czechoslovakia on 2 May.

Commanders
Colonel/Major General Ernst Wening (2 May 1941)
Major General/Lieutenant General Kurt Hoffmann (1 June 1942)
Major General/Lieutenant General Hans-Georg Hildebrandt (5 February 1944)
Colonel/ Major General Hans von Rohr (1 July 1944)
Colonel Hans-Joachim Ehlert (18 September 1944)
Major General Hans von Rohr (30 September 1944 - end)

References
German Order of Battle, Volume Two: 291st 999th Infantry Divisions, Named Infantry Divisions, and Special Divisions in World War II

Military units and formations established in 1941
Military units and formations disestablished in 1945
Infantry divisions of Germany during World War II